Colpodes is a genus of beetles in the family Carabidae, containing the following species:

 Colpodes abropoides Chaudoir, 1879
 Colpodes abruptus Andrewes, 1931
 Colpodes acanthodes Andrewes, 1930
 Colpodes acroglyptus Bates, 1892
 Colpodes acuticauda Darlington, 1952
 Colpodes adonis Tschitscherine, 1895
 Colpodes aeneipennis (Dejean, 1831)
 Colpodes aeneolus Andrewes, 1931
 Colpodes aenescens Chaudoir, 1879
 Colpodes aeruginosus Landin, 1955
 Colpodes anachoreta (Fairmaire, 1849)
 Colpodes andrewesi Heller, 1926
 Colpodes andrewesianus Jedlicka, 1932
 Colpodes angustus Andrewes, 1930
 Colpodes anomalus Andrewes, 1927
 Colpodes antedens Darlington, 1952
 Colpodes antennatus Louwerens, 1953
 Colpodes apotomus Andrewes, 1931
 Colpodes arrowi Jedlicka, 1934
 Colpodes asemus Jedlicka, 1934
 Colpodes asthenes Andrewes, 1931
 Colpodes atrocyaneus Landin, 1955
 Colpodes attenuatus Louwerens, 1953
 Colpodes azurescens Landin, 1955
 Colpodes babaulti Louwerens, 1953
 Colpodes baconi Chaudoir, 1878
 Colpodes balthasari Jedlicka, 1940
 Colpodes beccarii Andrewes, 1929
 Colpodes beckingi Louwerens, 1953
 Colpodes bennigseni Sloane, 1907
 Colpodes bilineatus Andrewes, 1931
 Colpodes bipars (Walker, 1858)
 Colpodes bipunctatus Jedlicka, 1935
 Colpodes bispina (Motschulsky, 1859)
 Colpodes bloetei Louwerens, 1953
 Colpodes boninensis Kasahara, 1991
 Colpodes brittoni Louwerens, 1953
 Colpodes brunneus (W.S.Macleay, 1825)
 Colpodes brunnicolor Louwerens, 1955
 Colpodes cardioderus Fairmaire, 1889
 Colpodes castaneiventris Bates, 1892
 Colpodes caudoimpressus Louwerens, 1969
 Colpodes celebensis Csiki, 1931
 Colpodes chalceus Andrewes, 1930
 Colpodes chalcochiton Andrewes, 1929
 Colpodes chinensis Jedlicka, 1934
 Colpodes chlorodes Andrewes, 1947
 Colpodes chloropterus Chaudoir, 1879
 Colpodes cimmerius Andrewes, 1930
 Colpodes coelitis Bates, 1892
 Colpodes concolor Louwerens, 1955
 Colpodes convexitarsis Louwerens, 1953
 Colpodes elegans Andrewes, 1929
 Colpodes latus Louwerens, 1949
 Colpodes nigratus Fairmaire, 1881

References 

Platyninae
Carabidae genera